Thomas Canner was Archdeacon of Dorset from 1542 to 1547.

Canner was educated at Magdalen College, Oxford, where he became a Fellow in 1517. He was also Provost of the Free Chapel of St. Nicholas sub Hamdenand Rector of Burton Bradstock.

Notes

1750 births
People from Rugeley
Alumni of Magdalen College, Oxford
Archdeacons of Dorset
1802 deaths
Clergy from Staffordshire